Pecharromán is a village located in the Province of Segovia, Castile and León (Spain). It belongs to the municipality of Valtiendas and has 12 inhabitants (2016). The village is 80 kilometers away from Segovia, and 863 meters above sea level.

Geography 
Pecharromán is located in the northern part of the Province of Segovia and in the center of the Iberian Peninsula. Its coordinates are: 41°28′43″N 3°57′07″O.

Demographics 

As in many small villages of Castile and León, the population of Pecharromán has been decreasing over the years. In the year 2000, 24 people lived in the village, but in 2016 the population decreased to 12.

Main sights 
 Iglesia de San Andrés (Saint Andrew Church): it is a church located in the center of Pecharromán. It is named after the village's patron saint, and still has some Romanesque remains.
 Iglesia de Santa María de Cárdaba (Saint Mary of Cárdaba Church): this church, also named Iglesia de Santa Apolonia, is located in the center of the village. It used to be a Romanesque monastery built in the 10th century.
 Ermita de la Virgen del Prado (Hermitage of the Meadows Virgin): it is a hermitage located in the surroundings of Pecharromán.

See also 
 List of municipalities in Segovia
 Province of Segovia
 Valtiendas

References 

Populated places in the Province of Segovia